The 2011–12 season was the 113th season of competitive league football in the history of English football club Wolverhampton Wanderers. The club competed in the Premier League, the highest level of English football, for a third consecutive season. The previous season had seen them narrowly survive on the final day, ending one point above the relegation zone after having occupied a place in it for much of the campaign.

After a poor season, the club were relegated to the Football League Championship, ending in 20th place. Their relegation was confirmed on 22 April with three games to spare. The team won just one of their final 24 games, and set a new club record of failing to keep a clean sheet in 30 consecutive league games.

Mick McCarthy began the campaign as the club's manager for a sixth campaign, but was sacked on 13 February 2012 after a 1–5 defeat to local rivals West Bromwich Albion. After searching for a new permanent successor for eleven days, the club opted to hand assistant manager Terry Connor the managerial post for the rest of the season. However, he failed to win any of his thirteen games in charge.

This season opened with the capacity of Molineux reduced due to the ongoing rebuilding of the new Stan Cullis Stand (North Bank) making it unavailable for use. The bottom tier of the new two-tiered structure was completed by mid-September to increase the stadium capacity to over 27,000.

Season review

In preparation for the season, the club made three signings during the summer transfer window. Jamie O'Hara, who had spent part of the previous season on loan at Wolves, was tied to a permanent deal, while defender Roger Johnson who had suffered relegation with Birmingham City was also bought. Goalkeeper Dorus de Vries was signed on a free transfer, having rejected a new deal at newly promoted Swansea, to provide competition to Wayne Hennessey. Having recruited extensively in the previous two summers since promotion, the addition of only three new players was a change in tack by the club, with chairman Steve Morgan stating "We don't need to do what we did the last two summers because the nucleus is there - the nucleus is 24-26 years-old. That's the heart of the team and they'll get better together."

The players began pre-season training on 5 July with six-day stay at a training camp in Kildare, Ireland. After returning to England the team undertook six pre-season matches, concluding with the only friendly at their Molineux home, a game against La Liga side Real Zaragoza.

Competitive action began with a 2–1 victory at Blackburn, the same opponent that they had faced on the final day of the previous season when they narrowly avoided relegation. A second win arrived in their next fixture, a home game against Fulham which was played with the North Bank stand closed to spectators due to its on-going reconstruction. Owing to the different kick-off times of matches, for a few hours after this victory Wolves briefly sat top of the Premier League.

An away point at Aston Villa continued their best opening to a top flight campaign in decades, but defeat at home to Tottenham halted this run. The team then began to drop down the table after suffering a run of six defeats in their next seven matches. Three points were finally gained after defeating Wigan in early November, and after two away defeats, a second successive home win was gained by beating Sunderland.

The Christmas/New Year period added more points, including from two trips to face Arsenal and Tottenham, but no further victories. The two North London clubs also provided Wolves with their two loan signings of the January window with defender Sébastien Bassong (from Tottenham) and midfielder Emmanuel Frimpong (from Arsenal) joining for the remainder of the campaign. Frimpong's service would be however be limited to five appearances as he soon ruptured cruciate ligaments in his knee and returned to his parent club.

Former Wolves starlet Robbie Keane returned to Molineux in mid-January with his loan club Aston Villa and scored twice to turn a 2–1 Wolves lead into a 2–3 defeat that dropped the club into the relegation zone for the first time. Another home loss three days later to Liverpool prompted chairman Steve Morgan to enter the dressing room after the game. Manager Mick McCarthy conceded that he was not pleased by this event but that he didn't feel his authority had been eroded.

Their following fixture brought their first win in twelve attempts – including two matches against Championship side Birmingham City in the FA Cup before their elimination. The 2–1 win at fellow strugglers, newly promoted QPR was to be both their final victory of the season and, ultimately, the final one of McCarthy's reign.

A 1–5 home thrashing at the hands of local rivals West Brom in their next game proved to be McCarthy's final in charge of Wolves. The morning after the match he was sacked after five-and-a-half years at the helm, the longest reign of any Wolves manager since Graham Turner in the late 1980s/early 1990s. Despite this dismissal both the club and McCarthy maintained an amicable stance, with many players also expressing regret at the turn of events.

The search for McCarthy's successor began immediately, with CEO Jez Moxey setting a provisional timetable for an appointment before their next fixture in twelve days time. Their pursuit of a new manager turned into a much-maligned event in the media, with a large number of candidates being linked with the position, and seemingly turning it down. The two most strongly linked candidates were the former Charlton and West Ham manager Alan Curbishley and Steve Bruce, recently fired by Sunderland. Both were widely reported as having been interviewed by the Wolves hierarchy.

Ultimately, neither were appointed and instead the task of managing the team was given to assistant manager Terry Connor for the remaining thirteen games of the season. This decision was derided for being in contrast to Moxey's early-stated belief that the job was "not for a novice"; with Connor having no previous management roles. Over the following weeks it emerged that Alan Curbishley was the only candidate who had also been offered the post but, after initially accepting it, had later had second thoughts and declined it.

Connor's first game at the helm brought a point as the team battled back from two goals down to draw 2–2 at Champions League hopefuls Newcastle. However things soon fell apart under Connor's control with the team losing their next seven consecutive matches, including a pair of 0–5 defeats, that left them mired at the foot of the table. Key home defeats to relegation rivals Blackburn and Bolton only worsened their prospects of avoiding the drop. During this period captain Roger Johnson was fined by the club for arriving at training under the influence of alcohol.

Although a goalless draw at Sunderland in mid-April eventually halted their losing streak, as well as a club record run of 30 league games without a clean sheet, only a finish of four consecutive wins could by this point prevent relegation. As it was, they lost their very next game, a 0–2 loss to eventual champions Manchester City and so confirmed their relegation with three games remaining. This brought to an end their Premier League status after three years, their longest consecutive stay in the top flight since the period 1977–82.

Two further points were gained to bring their final points tally to 25, one of the lowest recorded in any league campaign during the club's existence as well as the lowest in the Premier League for four seasons. On the eve of their final fixture the club announced that Connor, who had hoped to become a permanent appointment, would not be retained as manager and Norwegian coach Ståle Solbakken would instead take charge from July onward. Connor had failed to win any of his thirteen games in charge and gained just four points from a potential 39.

Results

Pre season
Wolves' six pre season games saw them face opposition from three different leagues, including a match in front of a 33,681 crowd at Celtic, the largest attendance at one of Wolves' pre season matches for some years. As had become common in recent years, only their final game was held at their Molineux home. A second "Wolves Development XI" team largely comprising academy prospects also played a series of matches during this period.

"Wolves Development XI" pre season results (all away): 3–2 vs Monaghan United (12 July), 3–0 vs Lisburn Distillery (15 July), 0–2 vs Shrewsbury Town (22 July), 1–1 vs Wrexham (26 July), 2–4 vs Kidderminster Harriers (29 July), 3–0 vs Airbus (1 August), 1–3 vs Telford United (8 August)

Premier League

A total of 20 teams competed in the Premier League in the 2011–12 season. Each team played every other team twice: once at their stadium, and once at the opposition's. Three points were awarded to teams for each win, one point per draw, and none for defeats.

The provisional fixture list was released on 17 June 2011, but was subject to change in the event of matches being selected for television coverage or police concerns.

Final table

Results Summary

Results by round

FA Cup

League Cup

Players
Squad rules operated in the Premier League for the season. Squads were capped at 25 senior players (those aged 21 and above at the beginning of 2011), and all squads had to include a minimum of 8 "homegrown" players. Wolves squads included 16, then 15, such players.

Statistics

|-
|align="left"|||align="left"|||align="left"| 
|34||0||0||0||0||0||34||0||1||0||
|-
|align="left"|||align="left"|||align="left"|  ¤
|||0||1||0||3||1||||1||0||0||
|-
|align="left"|||align="left"|||align="left"| 
|||3||0||0||2||1||||4||2||0||
|-
|align="left"|||align="left"|||align="left"| 
|||0||2||0||1||0||||0||6||0||
|-
|align="left"|||align="left"|||align="left"| 
|||0||0||0||2||0||||0||1||0||
|-
|align="left"|||align="left"|||align="left"|  ¤
|||3||1||0||||0||||3||2||0||
|-
|align="left"|||align="left"|||align="left"| 
|||0||1||0||||0||||0||7||1||
|-
|align="left"|||align="left"|FW||align="left"| 
|||1||2||0||1||2||||3||1||0||
|-
|align="left"|10||align="left"|FW||align="left"| 
|||12||||0||0||0||||12||2||0||
|-
|align="left"|11||align="left"|||align="left"| 
|38||3||||0||1||0||||3||2||0||
|-
|align="left"|12||align="left"|||align="left"| 
|||3||2||0||2||0||||3||6||0||
|-
|align="left"|13||align="left"|||align="left"|  ¤
|||0||0||0||0||0||||0||0||0||
|-
|align="left"|14||align="left"|||align="left"|  (c)
|||0||1||0||0||0||style="background:#98FB98"|||0||6||0||
|-
|align="left"|15||align="left"|||  style="background:#faecc8; text-align:left;"|  ‡
|||0||0||0||0||0||style="background:#98FB98"|||0||1||0||
|-
|align="left"|16||align="left"|||align="left"| 
|||0||2||0||1||0||||0||5||0||
|-
|align="left"|17||align="left"|||align="left"| 
|||8||||0||||0||||8||0||0||
|-
|align="left"|18||align="left"|FW||align="left"|  ¤
|||0||0||0||3||2||||2||1||0||
|-
|align="left"|19||align="left"|||align="left"|  ¤
|||0||1||0||||1||||1||2||0||
|-
|align="left"|20||align="left"|||align="left"| 
|||0||1||0||3||2||||2||2||1||
|-
|align="left"|21||align="left"|FW||align="left"|  ¤ †
|0||0||0||0||0||0||0||0||0||0||
|-
|align="left"|21||align="left"|||  style="background:#faecc8; text-align:left;"|  ‡
|||0||0||0||0||0||style="background:#98FB98"|||0||1||1||
|-
|align="left"|22||align="left"|||align="left"|  ¤
|0||0||0||0||0||0||0||0||0||0||
|-
|align="left"|22||align="left"|||align="left"| 
|||0||2||0||0||0||style="background:#98FB98"|||0||1||0||
|-
|align="left"|23||align="left"|||align="left"| 
|||1||0||0||0||0||||1||4||1||
|-
|align="left"|24||align="left"|||align="left"| 
|19||2||0||0||||1||||3||6||0||
|-
|align="left"|25||align="left"|||align="left"|  ¤
|0||0||0||0||0||0||0||0||0||0||
|-
|align="left"|26||align="left"|||align="left"|  ¤
|||0||0||0||||0||style="background:#98FB98"|||0||0||0||
|-
|align="left"|27||align="left"|FW||align="left"|  ¤
|0||0||0||0||0||0||0||0||0||0||
|-
|align="left"|28||align="left"|FW||align="left"|  ¤
|0||0||0||0||||0||style="background:#98FB98"|||0||0||0||
|-
|align="left"|29||align="left"|FW||align="left"| 
|||4||2||0||1||0||||4||4||0||
|-
|align="left"|30||align="left"|||align="left"|  ¤
|||0||1||0||3||0||||0||0||0||
|-
|align="left"|31||align="left"|||align="left"| 
|||0||2||0||3||0||style="background:#98FB98"|||0||0||0||
|-
|align="left"|32||align="left"|||align="left"| 
|||0||||0||1||0||||0||0||0||
|-
|align="left"|33||align="left"|FW||align="left"|  †
|||0||0||0||0||0||||0||0||0||
|-
|align="left"|34||align="left"|||align="left"|  ¤
|||0||||0||2||1||||1||2||0||
|-
|align="left"|35||align="left"|FW||align="left"|  ¤
|0||0||0||0||0||0||0||0||0||0||
|-
|align="left"|36||align="left"|||align="left"|  ¤ †
|0||0||0||0||0||0||0||0||0||0||
|-
|align="left"|37||align="left"|||align="left"| 
|||0||0||0||||0||style="background:#98FB98"|||0||0||0||
|-
|align="left"|38||align="left"|||align="left"|  ¤
|0||0||0||0||0||0||0||0||0||0||
|-
|align="left"|39||align="left"|||align="left"| 
|0||0||0||0||0||0||0||0||0||0||
|-
|align="left"|40||align="left"|FW||align="left"|  ¤
|0||0||0||0||1||0||||0||0||0||
|-
|align="left"|41||align="left"|||align="left"| 
|0||0||0||0||0||0||0||0||0||0||
|-
|align="left"|42||align="left"|FW||align="left"| 
|0||0||0||0||||0||style="background:#98FB98"|||0||0||0||
|-
|align="left"|43||align="left"|||align="left"|  ¤
|0||0||0||0||1||0||style="background:#98FB98"|||0||0||0||
|-
|align="left"|44||align="left"|||align="left"|  ¤
|0||0||0||0||0||0||0||0||0||0||
|-
|align="left"|45||align="left"|||align="left"| 
|0||0||0||0||0||0||0||0||0||0||
|-
|align="left"|46||align="left"|||align="left"| 
|||0||0||0||0||0||style="background:#98FB98"|||0||0||0||
|-
|align="left"|47||align="left"|||align="left"| 
|0||0||0||0||0||0||0||0||0||0||
|-
|align="left"|48||align="left"|||align="left"|  †
|0||0||0||0||0||0||0||0||0||0||
|}

Awards

Transfers

In

Out

Loans in

Loans out

Management and coaching staff

Kit
The season brought a new home kit, manufactured by supplier BURRDA. The new home kit featured the club's traditional gold and black colours, with the shirt removing the black collar design for a rounded gold neck. The away kit, retained from the previous season, was all black with gold piping. Both shirts featured the internet gambling company Sportingbet.com as sponsor.

References

2011–12 Premier League by team
2011-12